The State Library of Ohio is a state agency that provides services to state government and all types of libraries to ensure that all Ohio residents, rich or poor, rural or urban, receive the best possible library service and are able to engage in lifelong learning which strengthens the economic health of Ohio.

The State Library is governed by a five-member board. The Board members are appointed by the State Board of Education and each member serves a five-year term of office. Under the Ohio Revised Code, section 3375.01, the State Library Board is responsible for the State Library of Ohio and a statewide program of development and coordination of library services.

History
Governor Thomas Worthington established the State Library of Ohio in 1817 as the Ohio State Library. It was established with the purchase of 509 books. Initially it was not used by the public but by legislators. The public was able to use the library beginning in 1853. However it was not until 1896 that people were allowed to borrow materials. In June 1927, a lack of funds caused the library to close. Due to volunteer efforts it reopened a few months later but did not have state funding until the next year. In December 2000, the State Library moved from the Ohio Departments Building into the Jeffrey Mining Corporate Center, a converted factory that produced mining machinery.

Services
Today the State Library of Ohio collaborates with many state agencies and Ohio libraries to provide services.

Services to the state government

 Provides access to books, print and online journals, magazines, newspapers and eBooks, and resources and materials in the State Library and OhioLINK catalogs
 Provides services to borrow materials from other libraries, delivery and pick-up of library materials to offices, meeting space with video conferencing capability, and free parking.
 Provides work-related research and reference services to state legislators and state employees.
 Provides work-related library use assistance, research help and reference services, and online topic and how-to guides.
 Partners with state agencies to help residents access their government services through public libraries.
 Provides interlibrary loan services.
 Serves as Ohio’s only full regional depository for federal documents and the depository for Ohio state agency documents.

Services to Ohio libraries

 Assists in developing programs for staff and customers
 Assists in strategic and facilities planning.
 Administers the federal Library Services and Technology Act (LSTA) grant program. Under LSTA several competitive grant programs are administered including:  Guiding Ohio Online, Celebrating Ohio Book Awards and Authors, and Summer Library Programs.
 Coordinates the statewide delivery network.
 Coordinates the Ohio Digital Library.
 Collects and makes available statistics about Ohio public libraries for analysis, long range planning and comparison.
 Leads collaboration and partnership with Libraries Connect Ohio—to ensure all Ohioans continue to have access to high quality, relevant, and reliable online resources and publications, at no cost to libraries, schools, universities, and residents.
 Supports the Serving Every Ohioan (SEO) consortium of 98 library systems at more than 268 service points throughout 49 counties across Ohio through the SEO Library Service Center location in Caldwell.

Collaborates with the Ohio Public Library Information Network and other training partners in providing online & face to face Internet and Library Resource training for library employees

Services to Ohio residents

 Answers reference, research, and general “How do I find” questions.
 Collaborates with the Center for Outreach Services located at the Ohio School for the Deaf to provide access to a collection of Deafness and interpreting-related materials to all Ohioans.
 Contributes funding to the Ohio Web Library—online resources and publications available to all Ohioans through public, university, special and school libraries.
 Coordinates the Ohio Talking Book program for Ohio’s blind and print disabled residents including children and veterans of war.
 Manages a unique collection of library materials which may be borrowed by the public on a walk-in basis.  Collections include government and business documents, and management, education, health and criminal justice books and materials.
 Provides access to current and historical state and federal government documents (print & digital), and access to borrowing eBooks, DVDs, audio books, and other materials from OhioLINK and Search Ohio member libraries.
 Provides access to subscription-based library databases
 Provides technology skills training through local libraries and the SEO (Serving Every Ohioan) On Demand Technology Training program.
 Provides services to borrow materials from other libraries, delivery and pick-up of library materials to offices, meeting space with video conferencing capability, and free parki

Partners
 ALAO
 INFOhio
 Kent State University – School of Library and Information Science
 OELMA
 Ohio Library Council
 Ohioana Library
 OhioLINK
 OHIONET
 OPLIN
Ohio Library for the Blind and Physically Disabled
Cleveland Public Library

Regional library systems
 NEO-RLS
 NORWELD
 SERLS
 SWON Libraries

References

External links

1817 establishments in Ohio
Government agencies established in 1817
Libraries in Columbus, Ohio
State agencies of Ohio
Ohio
Libraries established in 1817